CNet Technology is a Taiwanese company that manufactures network equipment such as network cards, switches, and modems.

History
The company was established in 1989 in Hsinchu Science Park.

See also
 List of companies of Taiwan

References

External links 
 

1989 establishments in Taiwan
Computer companies established in 1989
Electronics companies established in 1989
Electronics companies of Taiwan
Networking hardware companies